David Anderson may refer to:

People

In academia or science
David Anderson (academic) (born 1952), American college professor
David Anderson (engineer) (1880–1953), Scottish civil engineer and lawyer
David Anderson, 2nd Viscount Waverley (1911–1990), British peer and physician
David F. Anderson (born 1978), professor at University of Wisconsin-Madison
David G. Anderson (born 1949), American archaeologist
David J. Anderson (born 1956), American neuroscientist
David P. Anderson (born 1955), scientist at University of California, Berkeley, director of SETI@home and BOINC
David Stirling Anderson (1895–1981), Scottish engineer and educationalist
David J. Anderson, engineer who developed the Kanban method

In arts, entertainment or media
David Anderson (animator) (1952–2015), director of animated films
David LeRoy Anderson, American make-up artist
David Onri Anderson (born 1993), American painter, musician and curator
David Anderson (artist) (d. 1847), Scottish painter

Fictional characters
David Anderson (Mass Effect), fictional character from Mass Effect: Revelation by Drew Karpyshyn

In business
David Munro Anderson (born 1937), British businessman
David W. Anderson, entrepreneur and founder of Famous Dave's restaurants and former head of the U.S. Bureau of Indian Education

In politics, government, or military
David Anderson (Australian politician) (1865–1936), New South Wales politician
David Anderson (British Army officer) (1821–1909), general and Governor of Sandhurst
David Anderson (British Columbia politician) (born 1937), Canadian Liberal politician and former cabinet member
David Anderson (British politician) (born 1953), British Labour politician
David Anderson (judge) (1916–1995), Scottish advocate and politician
David Anderson (Manx politician) (born 1954), current Minister of Transport and former Education Minister of the Isle of Man
David Anderson (Saskatchewan politician) (born 1957), Canadian Conservative politician
David Anderson (South Dakota politician) (born 1956), member of the South Dakota House of Representatives
David Anderson, Baron Anderson of Ipswich (born 1961), British barrister
David Anderson, Lord St Vigeans (1862–1948), Scottish lawyer and judge, Chairman of the Scottish Land Court 1918–34
David L. Anderson (attorney), United States Attorney for the Northern District of California
David Murray Anderson (1874–1936), sometime Governor of Newfoundland and New South Wales
David V. Anderson (1899–1979), Vermont politician

In religion
David Anderson (American bishop), American Anglican (ACNA) bishop
David Anderson (bishop of Rupert's Land) (1814–1885), English-born Canadian Anglican bishop

In sports
David Anderson (American football) (born 1983), American football wide receiver
David Anderson (boxer) (born 1965), British Olympic boxer
David Anderson (cricketer) (1940–2005), Australian cricketer
David Anderson (high jumper) (born 1965), Australian former high jumper
David Anderson (ice hockey) (born 1962), Canadian former professional ice hockey player
David Anderson (rower) (born 1932), Australian Olympic rower
David Anderson Jr. (1867–1919), Scottish golfer
David Anderson Sr. (1847–1912), Scottish golfer
David Anderson (rugby league), Australian rugby league player

Other
David L. Anderson (outlaw) (1862–1918), a.k.a. Billy Wilson, American outlaw
David Nathaniel Anderson, one of the perpetrators of the 2019 Jersey City shooting

See also
Dave Anderson (disambiguation)
David Andersson (disambiguation)
David Andersen (born 1980), Australian basketball player
David Andersen (goldsmith) (1843–1901), Norwegian goldsmith